David Russell Wood (born 13 December 1948) is a retired British Circuit judge.

He was educated at Sedbergh School, the University of East Anglia (BA, 1970). He was called to the bar at Gray's Inn in 1973 and was a Circuit judge from 1995 to 2014. He served as President of the Council of Circuit Judges in 2008.

References

1948 births
Living people
People educated at Sedbergh School
Alumni of the University of East Anglia
Members of Gray's Inn